Metropolitan Homoeopathic Medical College & Hospital, is a Homoeopathic Medical College in Sodepur, Kolkata, West Bengal, India.

The college was established on 2 June 1972. It offers the Bachelor of Homeopathic Medicine and Surgery (B.H.M.S) course.

History
Initially a building at  160 B.B. Gangaul Street, Kolkata- 700012 was taken on rent for functioning as hospital and rented by Dr. Pradosh Majumder (Founder Of MHMC&H). 

Latter on purchased at 77 B.B. Gangaul Street, Kolkata- 700012 , where the college was established.

The first committee was included with honourable Dr. Pradosh Majumder and Sankar Das Banerjee, (Coach of All India Football Team) and some other famous personality.

The college was established for D.M.S. Course on 2 June 1972 with 400 students.

This time Principle was Dr. Satya Brata Sinha & Dr. Pradosh Majumder was Rector. 
This Institution got a favourable and fabulous response from the local inhabitants and very soon upgraded to D.H.M.S. Course with 100 students during 1986.

In the mean time a lot of students passed the diploma course with outstanding results out of which a number of them were awarded with Gold Medel from W.B. State Council of Homoeopathic Medicine.

During 1999 the institution has got the affiliation in degree course from Central Council of Homoeopathy and Department of AYUSH, Government of India transferred to Ramchandrapur, P.O. Sodepur, Kolkata:- 700 110.

Departments
All Departments:-
 Anatomy 
 Physiology including Biochemistry
 Pharmacy
 Surgery
 Obstetrics & Gynaecology and Infant Care
 Community Medicine
 Forensic Medicine & Toxicology
 Pathology & Micro-Biology
 Sonology
 Eye
 Dental
 Repertory
 Materia Medica & Therapeutics
 Organon of Medicine & Principles of Homoeopathic Philosophy & Psychology
 Practice of Medicine & Homoeopathic Therapeutics

Admission
Bachelor of Homoeopathic Medicine and Surgery (B.H.M.S) Course under the West Bengal University of Health Sciences. The course is spread over a period of five and half year. Including compulsory internship of one year after passing the Final Degree examination.

No of Seats= Fifty(50)

Anti Ragging Cell
In terms of the guidelines to curb the menace of ragging in Homoeopathic Medical College & Hospital the Central Council of Homoeopathy by their advice under reference - 14-16/2012-CCH/13613-13796 dated ─ 19.06.2012 directed to prepare an Anti Ragging Cell.

Facilities
Canteen
Library

Gallery

See also
Calcutta Homoeopathic Medical College & Hospital
List of hospitals in India

References

External links
 Official Website

Homeopathic hospitals
Hospitals in West Bengal
Universities and colleges in North 24 Parganas district
Homoeopathic Medical Colleges in West Bengal
Affiliates of West Bengal University of Health Sciences
1972 establishments in West Bengal
Educational institutions established in 1972